East Gate may refer to:

East Gate (Luohu), English for Dongmen, Shenzhen, China
East Gate, British Columbia, Canada
East Gate Bel Air, Los Angeles, California, a neighborhood
East Gate Range, a mountain range in Nevada
East Gate Square, a regional shopping mall in New Jersey
East Gate/West Gate, a sculpture by Sasson Soffer in Indianapolis, Indiana

See also
Eastgate (disambiguation)